Robert Edward "Judy" Gans (July 16, 1886 - February 13, 1949) was a Negro leagues outfielder, pitcher and manager for several years before the founding of the first Negro National League, and in its first few seasons.

Gans played most of his seasons for the Chicago American Giants and the Lincoln Giants. He took part of what is considered the first "postseason" series between Negro league baseball teams. The American Giants, considered the best team of the West, faced the best team of the East in the Lincoln Giants. In Game 14, Gans was the starting pitcher for New York in the decisive game of a series that had spanned nearly a month. He allowed just one run on nine hits as the Lincoln Giants won 4-1 to win their eighth game of the series. A postseason series would not be played again between Negro league teams for eight years. 

He attended Washington and Jefferson College in his hometown of Washington, Pennsylvania.

Gans served in the American Expeditionary Forces during World War I; he was mustered out of service as a Sergeant of Company M, 803 U. S. Pioneer Infantry on May 19, 1919 with an Honorable Discharge.

In his later years, Gans lived and worked in the city of Philadelphia, Pennsylvania, where he died in 1949 at the age of 62, leaving behind a wife, Elvera C. (Gardner) Gans, whom he married in 1937.

He is buried at the Beverly National Cemetery in Beverly, New Jersey.

References

External links
 and Baseball-Reference Black Baseball stats and Seamheads

Negro league baseball managers
Chicago American Giants players
Lincoln Giants players
Brooklyn Royal Giants players
Indianapolis ABCs players
San Francisco Park players
Matanzas players
People from Washington, Pennsylvania
1886 births
1949 deaths
Baseball players from Philadelphia
Burials at Beverly National Cemetery
American expatriate baseball players in Cuba
20th-century African-American people